Clarkcomanthus is a genus of echinoderms belonging to the family Comatulidae.

The species of this genus are found in Malesia, Australia and East Africa.

Species:

Clarkcomanthus albinotus 
Clarkcomanthus alternans 
Clarkcomanthus comanthipinna 
Clarkcomanthus littoralis 
Clarkcomanthus luteofuscum 
Clarkcomanthus mirabilis 
Clarkcomanthus mirus 
Clarkcomanthus perplexum

References

Comatulidae
Crinoid genera